Armin Đerlek (born 15 July 2000) is a Serbian footballer who plays for Turkish club Sivasspor.

Club career

Early years
Born in Novi Pazar, Đerlek started playing football with local academy named "AS" at the age of 7. Four years later, he moved to Pazar Juniors. In an interview made in 2017, he remembered on 28 January 2011, when grandfather took him to the first training. Playing for the club, he was affirmed as "the target man" in the academy since 2015 when he left the club as one of the top youth prospects in Serbia. He moved to OFK Beograd in summer 2015 at the age of 15, penning his first three-year professional contract with the club. He sued the club for unpaid wages and received a dispute over arbitration in March 2017, when he left OFK Beograd as a free agent. Later, same month, it was announced about his moving to Partizan. Previously, he had been marked as a pick of the greatest rival, Red Star Belgrade.

Partizan
On 28 April 2017, Đerlek signed a three-year contract with Partizan, when he was officially promoted by club's director of football, Ivica Iliev. He passed summer pre-season with the first team, but failed to make any official appearances with the club for the rest of 2017. In February 2018, Đerlek joined the first squad under coach Miroslav Đukić, among a group of youth players who impressed during the winter-break, choosing to wear number 44 jersey. He made his professional debut for Partizan in 23rd fixture match of the 2017–18 Serbian SuperLiga campaign, having played 67 minutes in 2–1 away victory over Mladost Lučani on 18 February 2018. Đerlek noted his first Eternal Derby on 14 April 2018, having played 57 minutes of the match. Đerlek was replaced by Zoran Tošić in second-half, while Partizan archived 2–1 defeat in the game. Đerlek won his first trophy with Partizan after 2–1 victory over Mladost Lučani in final match of the 2017–18 Serbian Cup on 23 May 2018. In summer 2018, after Gabriel Enache joined the club and took number 44 shirt, Đerlek converted his squad number to 8, which previously had worn by Vladimir Đilas. Đerlek played his first continental match for Partizan in 3–0 victory over Rudar Pljevlja on 19 July 2018.

Sivasspor
On 5 August 2019, Đerlek signed a five-year contract with Turkish Süper Lig club Sivasspor.

International career
In 2014, Đerlek was invited into Serbian under-15 national team under coach Marko Mitrović. He scored a goal in a debut match for the team against Montenegro on 9 December 2014. He also scored against the Netherlands on 11 February 2015. Đerlek continued playing with Serbian under-16 selection between 2015 and 2016, scoring in matches against Poland and Macedonia, and in a match against Montenegro on 10 June 2016, when he scored a hat trick. He also scored on his debut match for Serbian under-17 level against Hungary on 8 December 2015. He played performed as a captain until summer 2017, helping the team to qualify on the UEFA European Under-17 Championship in 2016 and 2017. In December 2017, Perica Ognjenović called Đerlek in Serbian under-18 national team for the tournament in Israel. He made his debut for the team as a captain in 1–0 defeat against home team on 11 December same year, and also played against Germany next day.

Playing style

Standing at 5-foot-8-inches (1.73 m), Đerlek usually operates as an attacking midfielder. He can use both legs equally well, which allows him to create a position for a shot from multiple angles. He is characterised as a creative playmaker with strong pace, likewise good ball control and game vision. He is also described as classic number 10 in 4-2-3-1 formation, with leadership and captaincy roles. Due to his playing style, The Guardian compared him with Eden Hazard as also his compatriot Adem Ljajić.

Career statistics

Club

Honours

Club
Partizan
Serbian Cup: 2017–18

References

External links
 
 
 
 

2000 births
Living people
Sportspeople from Novi Pazar
Association football midfielders
Serbian footballers
Serbia youth international footballers
FK Partizan players
Serbian SuperLiga players
NK Aluminij players
Slovenian PrvaLiga players
Sivasspor footballers
Süper Lig players
Serbian expatriate footballers
Expatriate footballers in Turkey
Serbian expatriate sportspeople in Turkey
Expatriate footballers in Slovenia
Serbian expatriate sportspeople in Slovenia
Bosniaks of Serbia
Serbia under-21 international footballers